Micropentila nigeriana, the Nigerian dots, is a butterfly in the family Lycaenidae. It is found in Ghana and Nigeria (west and Cross River loop). The habitat consists of primary forests.

References

Butterflies described in 1965
Poritiinae